Satan in Sables is a 1925 American silent drama film directed by James Flood and starring Lowell Sherman and Pauline Garon. It was produced and released by Warner Brothers.

Cast

Preservation status
A print of Satan in Sables survives in the Museum of Modern Art, New York City.

References

External links

Lobby poster (archived)

1925 films
American silent feature films
Films directed by James Flood
Warner Bros. films
Silent American drama films
1925 drama films
1920s American films